Maciej Bolesław Lampe (born February 5, 1985) is a Polish professional basketball player.

Professional career

Originally from Łódź, Poland, Lampe grew up in Stockholm, Sweden. He played briefly for Real Madrid in the Spanish ACB League before being sent on loan to Universidad Complutense of the LEB, the second division level in Spain, to receive more playing time.

NBA
Lampe was selected by the NBA club the New York Knicks in the second round (30th overall) of the 2003 NBA draft as an early entry candidate, despite having been projected as a top five lottery pick. Lampe was elected to the 2003 Reebok Rocky Mountain Revue All-Revue Team after averaging 17.2 points and 7.0 rebounds in 32.4 minutes for the Knicks' summer league team. Lampe was traded to the Phoenix Suns on January 5, 2004 deal, and at the time, he became the youngest player in Suns history to appear in a regular season game, as well as the first Suns player to play while being 18 years old.

In January 2005, he got traded for the second time in his NBA career, this time to the New Orleans/Oklahoma City Hornets. On February 13, 2006, he was traded to the Houston Rockets for point guard Moochie Norris, making the Rockets his fourth NBA club. He played the total number of 61 games in NBA. He holds NBA career averages of 3.4 points per game, 2.2 rebounds per game, and 0.3 assists per game. 

Lampe's final NBA game was played on April 4th, 2006 in a 87 - 104 loss to the Seattle SuperSonics where he recorded 1 rebound in only 2 and half minutes of playing time.
In 2010, he was selected by the Cleveland Cavaliers to play on the Summer League team.

NBA transactions
 June 26, 2003 – Selected with the 30th pick by the New York Knicks (the pick originally belonged to the Denver Nuggets and was acquired by the Knicks in the Marcus Camby deal).
 August 13, 2003 – Signed a 3-year, $2.9 million contract with the Knicks
 January 5, 2004 – Traded with Antonio McDyess, Howard Eisley, Charlie Ward, rights to Miloš Vujanić, 2004 first-round draft pick (used to select Kirk Snyder), future first-round draft pick (used in 2010 to select Gordon Hayward) and $3 million to the Phoenix Suns for Stephon Marbury, Penny Hardaway and Cezary Trybański.
 January 21, 2005 – Traded with Casey Jacobsen and Jackson Vroman to the New Orleans Hornets for Jim Jackson and 2005 second-round draft pick (used to select Marcin Gortat).
 February 13, 2006 – Traded to the Houston Rockets for Moochie Norris.

Russia
Lampe signed a one-year deal with the ULEB Cup (now called EuroCup) club Dynamo Saint Petersburg, however the team went bankrupt shortly thereafter. The bankrupt Dynamo squad was thrown out of the Russian Superleague A one day before the start of the season. Thus, Lampe moved to Khimki. In February 2008, Khimki beat CSKA Moscow in the Russian Cup final and Lampe was awarded the best player (MVP) of the cup final. He then signed a three-year contract extension with Khimki.

Lampe returned to Russia in January 2010, signing with UNICS Kazan. He was voted the 2010–11 season's Russian PBL MVP for the regular season.

Israel
Lampe signed a one-year deal with an option for another season with the Israeli Super League club Maccabi Tel Aviv in July 2009.

Spain
In July 2011 he signed with Caja Laboral Vitoria for two seasons. In December 2012, Lampe was named the MVP of the month of December in the 2012–13 EuroLeague.

In August 2013, he signed a three-year contract with FC Barcelona.

China
In July 2016, Lampe signed with the Shenzhen Leopards. He was replaced on the roster before the 2017–18 season with Jared Sullinger because of injury. In November 2017, Lampe signed with the Qingdao Eagles.

On August 19, 2019, he has signed with Sichuan Blue Whales of the Chinese Basketball Association.

Poland
On December 31, 2020, he has signed with Wilki Morskie Szczecin of the PLK.

Taiwan
On September 9, 2021, he has signed with TaiwanBeer HeroBears of the T1 League. On December 24, Lampe took a plane to Spain for recovery.

Career statistics

EuroLeague

|-
| style="text-align:left;"| 2001–02
| style="text-align:left;"| Real Madrid
| 3 || 0 || 7.4 || .500 || .500 || .000 || .7 || .0 || .0 || .0 || 3.0 || .0
|-
| style="text-align:left;"| 2002–03
| style="text-align:left;"| Real Madrid
| 4 || 0 || 9.8 || .333 || .000 || .750 || 2.8 || .0 || .0 || .0 || 4.0 || 3.5
|-
| style="text-align:left;"| 2009–10
| style="text-align:left;"| Maccabi
| 8 || 4 || 17.3 || .444 || .389 || .900 || 3.8 || .9 || .5 || .3 || 8.0 || 8.4
|-
| style="text-align:left;"| 2012–13
| style="text-align:left;"| Caja Laboral
| 28 || 24 || 24.6 || .484 || .318 || .765 || 6.1 || .8 || .6 || .5 || 13.9 || 13.8
|-
| style="text-align:left;"| 2013–14
| style="text-align:left;"| Barcelona
| 19 || 6 || 14.4 || .505 || .333 || .724 || 3.3 || .7 || .2 || .4 || 7.0 || 7.1
|-
| style="text-align:left;"| 2014–15
| style="text-align:left;"| Barcelona
| 24 || 3 || 13.3 || .425 || .238 || .814 || 3.8 || .6 || .3 || .4 || 6.2 || 7.1
|- class="sortbottom"
| style="text-align:left;"| Career
| style="text-align:left;"|
| 86 || 37 || 17.3 || .468 || .308 || .777 || 4.3 || .7 || .3 || .4 || 8.8 || 8.5
|}

Polish national team
Lampe has been a member of the senior Polish national basketball team. He played for Poland's national team at EuroBasket 2009.

See also
List of oldest and youngest National Basketball Association players
 List of youngest EuroLeague players

Notes

References

External links
 Official website
 Maciej Lampe Q & A – Basketball Without Borders Africa
 
 Maciej Lampe at draftexpress.com
 Maciej Lampe at eurobasket.com
 Maciej Lampe at euroleague.net
 Maciej Lampe at tblstat.net

1985 births
Living people
BC Khimki players
BC UNICS players
Beşiktaş men's basketball players
Centers (basketball)
FC Barcelona Bàsquet players
Houston Rockets players
Jilin Northeast Tigers players
Liga ACB players
Maccabi Tel Aviv B.C. players
National Basketball Association players from Poland
New Orleans Hornets players
New York Knicks draft picks
Phoenix Suns players
Polish men's basketball players
Polish expatriate basketball people in the United States
Polish expatriate basketball people in Spain
Power forwards (basketball)
Qingdao Eagles players
Real Madrid Baloncesto players
Saski Baskonia players
Shenzhen Leopards players
Sportspeople from Łódź
Sportspeople from Stockholm
Swedish men's basketball players
Polish expatriate basketball people in Taiwan
Polish expatriate basketball people in China
Polish expatriate basketball people in Russia
Polish expatriate basketball people in Israel
Polish expatriate basketball people in Turkey
Polish expatriate basketball people in France
Swedish expatriate basketball people in Taiwan
Swedish expatriate basketball people in China
Swedish expatriate basketball people in Russia
Swedish expatriate basketball people in Israel
Swedish expatriate basketball people in Turkey
Swedish expatriate basketball people in France
Swedish expatriate basketball people in the United States
Swedish expatriate basketball people in Spain